Bosea vaviloviae is a Gram-negative and rod-shaped bacterium from the genus of Bosea which has been isolated from the nodules of the plant Vavilovia formosa.

References

Hyphomicrobiales
Bacteria described in 2015